Jimmie Mack is an American rock singer and songwriter.

Mack was a singer with the Earl Slick Band, and wrote most of Earl Slick's guitar-led material. In 1977, Mack cut a debut solo LP. He also provided backing vocals for rock musician David Johansen on his David Johansen album in 1978.

Discography
Earl Slick Band  (Songwriter, Lead Vocalist, Guitar) 1975
Earl Slick Band Razor Sharp (Songwriter, Lead Vocalist, Guitar) 1976
Stunts (Vocalist, film soundtrack) 1977
Jimmie Mack 1978
Jimmie Mack On The Corner 1979 
Jimmie Mack & The Jumpers 1980
Earl Slick Band Live '76 (Songwriter, Lead Vocalist, Guitar) 2001
Earl Slick Band Sick Trax (Songwriter, Lead Vocalist, Guitar) 2002

References

Living people
Year of birth missing (living people)
Big Tree Records artists